The Mali–Netherlands relations refers to the current diplomatic and military ties between the Republic of Mali and the Kingdom of the Netherlands.

Embassy 
The Netherlands Embassy is located on Rue 437 Hippodrome, in the capital of Bamako, Mali. The head of the mission is Embassodor Maarten Adriaan Brouwer. Mali holds an Honorary consulate in Rotterdam.

U.N mission in Northern Mali 

The Netherlands have contributed a 450-strong Special Forces and intelligence gathering contingent to serve in the United Nations Multidimensional Integrated Stabilization Mission in Mali. The announcement was made by Foreign Minister Frans Timmermans in July 2014.

The Dutch army contingent was headed by General Tom Middendorp until 2017. Four Dutch peacekeeping troops have been killed and an Apache helicopter lost since 2015;

Dutch Defense Minister resignation 
On 4 October 2017, Dutch Minister of Defense, Jeanine Hennis-Plasschaert, resigned over the deaths of 2 Dutch servicemen and gravely wounding of another in a training accident in Mali in July 2016. The Dutch Safety Board ruled that the military had been using old, defective grenades that had not been tested or stored correctly. General Middendorp also resigned his position due to these failures.

See also
 Foreign relations of Mali
 Foreign relations of the Netherlands

References

 
Netherlands
Bilateral relations of the Netherlands